Lawrence Herbst (March 5, 1916 – May 12, 2003) was an American politician who served in the New York State Assembly from 1971 to 1978.

He died on May 12, 2003, in Newburgh, New York at age 87.

References

1916 births
2003 deaths
Republican Party members of the New York State Assembly
20th-century American politicians